Westow is a village and civil parish in the Ryedale district of the county of North Yorkshire, England. The village lies in the historic boundaries of the East Riding of Yorkshire.

The village has traditional associations with agriculture and is a popular sporting area in the summer. There are regular Pétanque tournaments in the village involving teams from all over Yorkshire. Westow has a village cricket team with records dating back to 1875. 

The civil parish also includes the hamlets of Firby and Kirkham. The population of the civil parish was 339 in the 2011 Census. Neighboring villages are Crambe, Whitwell-on-the-Hill, Welburn, Howsham, Leavening and Burythorpe.

History 

Parish records of graves dating back to 1500s build a view of a small community established for the purpose of agriculture. It is highly likely the village origins are older than this as the Ryedale area has significant evidence of Medieval and Roman settlement and activity. In all probability the location of Westow was originally chosen and occupied at a time when farming techniques were undeveloped and people were highly dependent on the natural environment and what it could provide. Westow is surrounded by fertile soils with good irrigation, and in the lee of the hill is partly sheltered from north and easterly winds. These characteristics are likely to have led to the location of Westow being chosen for settlement. Today as throughout the centuries, for some residents village life continues to revolve around farming and agriculture, or providing services those living in the area. With improved mobility and opportunities for remote work, others have chosen Westow for the country living, commute to towns and cities for work or work from home, whilst others have retired into the area.

Property 
The oldest part of Westow village lies within a conservation area and is south of the village pub, along 'Main Street'. Property predominantly comprises detached, semi-detached and terraced houses and cottages, finished in traditional locally quarried oolite limestone, with red pan-tile roofs. There are fifteen Grade II English Heritage listed properties in Westow. These include the church, the pub, Westow Hall, Yew Tree Cottage, Chantry Cottage, Corner House, Fox & Hounds House, Herbert Cottage, Manor Farmhouse, Tarrs Cottages, and High Farmhouse amongst others.

This property market attracts considerable attention. Property is generally freehold and much has stayed in the same ownership for some time, often generations of the same family. Much property and surrounding land is owned by the private country estates of Garrowby Hall, Westow Hall, Castle Howard, Whitwell Hall and Kirkham Hall. This has a major influence on the market as the owners generally have no desire to sell. In addition, in recent years a small number of commuters and city dwellers have chosen the village for second homes for the country life and due to good road accessibility to the transport links to London and Edinburgh.

Tourist attractions 
 Kirkham Priory, built by Augustinian monks in 1121 on the banks of the Derwent River;
 Castle Howard, a stately home built between 1699 and 1712 for the 3rd Earl of Carlisle;
 Wharram Percy, a deserted medieval village;
 Richard III's seat and the tomb of Edward of Middleham, the Prince of Wales at Sheriff Hutton;
 Stamford Bridge, the scene of the Vikings defeat in 1066 by King Harold Godwinson;
 Howsham Mill, the restored water-mill that used to serve Howsham Hall;
 Yorkshire Air Museum, preserving the areas military aviation heritage;
 Hovingham Hall, the childhood home of the Duchess of Kent;

Point-to-point racing takes place annually at Whitwell-on-the-Hill to the West of the village and is a popular, well-attended event.

The village is a popular way point for cyclists, motorcyclists and drivers as from the A64 road it is on the edge of excellent driving roads stretching from Beverley across to Helmsley and to Whitby on the North East English coast.

The village is also in military low-flying airspace zone (LFA12). On week days the sight of all types of military aircraft on training missions is a frequent and spectacular occurrence. Most frequent are the Short Tucanos from RAF Linton-on-Ouse.

Second World War 
During the Second World War, Kirkham Priory was used for large scale trials of D-Day wading and amphibious vehicles by the British Army and was visited secretly by Winston Churchill and King George VI. Women's Land Army (WLA) civilians were billeted in the village. 

Bombs were dropped close to Firby Hall by a German aircraft. In October 1942 a German Aircraft (Junkers Ju 88A from 7/KG4) was hit by ground defence fire during a low level attack on Driffield aerodrome. It crash landed on Richmond Farm, Duggleby with one fatality.

A Halifax Bomber crashed on a training flight near Greets Farm, Welburn in 1942, and a P-51 Mustang crashed at Fotherdale Farm near Thixendale in 1945.

Many evacuees from Kingston upon Hull, which was heavily bombed during the Second World War, were housed with Westow families.

Services 
The nearby market town of Malton, North Yorkshire, five miles away, is the closest place to find most amenities, including hospital, police and fire stations, railway and bus stations, shops, restaurants, tennis and squash courts, swimming pool, rugby and cricket clubs, cinema and schools.

There are no schools in Westow.

Governance and politics 

Westow used to lie within the Ryedale Constituency, held from 1987 by Conservative MP Mr. John Greenaway, until the constituency was abolished in 2010. It is now within the Thirsk and Malton constituency, held by the Conservative Kevin Hollinrake with a 19,456 majority, one of the more 'safe' seats in the country.

The lowest tier of governance is the Westow Parish Council, which represents an area that includes Westow, Firby and Kirkham. It has specific responsibilities to undertake on behalf of the parish residents and a small amount of budget from local council taxes. There are nine Parish Councillors and a Parish Clerk who meet usually every two months throughout the year.

Notable residents 
 The East German dissident and writer Thomas Brasch was born in Westow in 1945, the son of German Jewish Communist émigré parents.
 Christopher Beckett, 4th Baron Grimthorpe, OBE, DL, (16 September 1915 – 6 July 2003), was a soldier and company director and resided in Westow Hall. He married Elizabeth Lumley in 1954, and was awarded the OBE in 1958. Beckett was the eldest son of Ralph Beckett, 3rd Baron Grimthorpe.
 Lady Elizabeth Lumley was born in July 1925. She is the daughter of Lawrence Roger Lumley, 11th Earl of Scarbrough and Katherine Isobel McEwen. She married Christopher John Beckett, 4th Baron Grimthorpe, son of Ralph William Ernest Beckett, 3rd Baron Grimthorpe and Mary Alice Archdale, on 17 February 1954. Baroness Grimthorpe's home is Westow Hall.
 Edward Beckett, 5th Baron Grimthorpe, (20 November 1954–) is a British peer and Westow Hall his childhood home. His father was Christopher Beckett, 4th Baron Grimthorpe and his mother Lady Elizabeth Beckett, Baroness Grimthorpe (née Lumley).

Gallery

References

 Westow in the local press, "The Village With Hidden Talents"
 Kirkham's Role in D-Day preparations
 Details of North Yorkshire aircraft crashes
 Diary of wartime events in North Yorkshire
 Baron Grimthorpe's obituary
 Malton connection to Charles Dickens
 Ministry of Defence Information on Low Flying Area 12
 Westow official website https://westow.org.uk/
 Yorkshire Guide of Westow http://www.yorkshireguides.com/westow.html

External links 

 National Monuments Photographic Records of Westow Listed Properties
 Archival information on Westow population
 Westow Community War Cross

Villages in North Yorkshire
Civil parishes in North Yorkshire